The 1888 United States presidential election in Michigan took place on November 6, 1888, as part of the 1888 United States presidential election. Voters chose 13 electors to the Electoral College, which selected the president and vice president.

Michigan voted for Republican nominees Benjamin Harrison of Indiana and his running mate Levi P. Morton of New York over Democratic incumbent Grover Cleveland.

Results

Results by county

See also
 United States presidential elections in Michigan

Notes

References

Michigan
1888
1888 Michigan elections